Silvia Paula Valentim Lutucuta (born 14 July 1968) is an Angolan politician and cardiologist, the incumbent Minister of Health.

Life
Lutucuta was born in Huambo in 1968. She trained in medicine and specialised in cardiology at the Hospital de Santa Maria in Lisbon, Portugal. In 2000 she moved to Houston in Texas where she undertook post-doctoral research at Baylor College of Medicine.

She joined the Angolan Society of Cardiovascular Diseases.

She is a member of the Member of the MPLA Political Bureau. In 2017 she was nominated to be the Minister of Health in Angola. She has created thousands of new jobs especially in rural layers. Under her leadership vaccines for COVID-19 were roled out in her country and she organised the funding.

References

1968 births
Living people
People from Huambo
Cardiologists
Angolan physicians